Attila Ungvári (born 23 July 1990) is a Hungarian judoka.

He is the bronze medallist at the 2019 European Judo Championships and is scheduled to represent Hungary at the 2020 Summer Olympics.

References

External links
 
 

1988 births
Living people
Hungarian male judoka
Judoka at the 2019 European Games
European Games medalists in judo
European Games bronze medalists for Hungary
Judoka at the 2020 Summer Olympics
Olympic judoka of Hungary
20th-century Hungarian people
21st-century Hungarian people